The Three Rivers Regional Library System (TRRL) is a public library system that serves the counties of Brantley, Camden, Charlton, Long, McIntosh, and Wayne, Georgia, United States. The administrative office of the system is located in Jesup.

The library system is named after the three rivers that course through Southeast Georgia: the St. Marys River, the Altamaha River, and the Satilla River.

TRRL is a member of PINES, a program of the Georgia Public Library Service that covers 53 library systems in 143 counties of Georgia. Any resident in a PINES supported library system has access to the system's collection of 10.6 million books. The library is also serviced by GALILEO, a program of the University System of Georgia which stands for "GeorgiA LIbrary LEarning Online". This program offers residents in supported libraries access to over 100 databases indexing thousands of periodicals and scholarly journals. It also boasts over 10,000 journal titles in full text.

History

Wayne County Library

The founding of the Three Rivers Regional Library System may be attributed to the first library in Wayne County, as this county is the home of the current central headquarters for the system. Built in 1937 through efforts by the Works Progress Administration, the Wayne County Library started off with a small, inadequate building. By the end of 1938 many of the books in the collection were already in bad repair, and public funding of the library was minimal. Constant financial support was afforded to the library by the Georgia Library Commission for its first decade in order to stay afloat.

Towards the beginning of 1950 the Tecoma Garden Club helped to alleviate some of the library's financial issues. The club first secured permission and petitioned interested parties for monies to construct a library space in the local Community House. The initial goal of $2,000 was met and exceeded, and in the end the Garden Club has raised $6,000 to be used for the project. In order to incorporate the ideologies of the Garden Club with the wishes of the Public Library blueprints called for a library which included large windows and French doors looking out onto a grassed terrace, nestled in a grove of pine trees. Due to problems in construction the entire $6,000 fund was spent before the building saw completion. The City of Jesup provided $200 for plumbing and heating, and the rest of the $2,000 deficit was raised through more efforts by the Garden Club. The library officially opened on November 9, 1949, and is the building which is still in use today.

Regional History
The next county of the system to have a library was Camden County, which began its library also in 1949. Throughout the next fifty years six neighboring counties joined the system, and in 2000 the name was officially changed to Three Rivers Regional Library System.

In 2010 disagreements broke out between the library in Glynn County and the rest of the system. By 2013 Glynn County formed its own library system in the county seat, Brunswick, called the Marshes of Glynn Libraries.

Branches

Library systems in neighboring counties
Ohoopee Regional Library System to the north
Live Oak Public Libraries to the northeast
Marshes of Glynn Libraries to the east
Okefenokee Regional Library System to the west

References

External links
PINES catalog

County library systems in Georgia (U.S. state)
Public libraries in Georgia (U.S. state)